Abdussalam Puthige is the Editor-in-Chief of Varthabharathi, a Kannada daily Newspaper, published from Mangalore the coastal city of Karnataka and Bangalore, the state capital. The first issue of Vartha Bharathi hit the stands on 29 August 2003 from Mangalore.

Career
His English work, Towards Performing Da'wah, was published in UK by The International Council for Islamic Information (ICII), Leicester.
Puthige has dealt with marginalised communities in a widely published interview titled 'The Muslim Kannadiga' by scholar and researcher Yoginder Sikand.

'Kannadadalli Qur'an Anuvada' was released on 1 September 2012 by Rajarshi Dr.Veerendra Heggade, Dharmadhikari of Shree Kshetra, Dharmasthala Temple. This work has already seen 4 Editions. Its third Edition was published in Dubai by the Department of Islamic Affairs, Government of Dubai, UAE. The releasing ceremony in Dubai was inaugurated by Mr. MK Lokesh, Ambassador of India in UAE. This translation of Quran is available online. The same is also available as an android application the Google Play for free with the title 'Quran in Kannada' .

Bibliography

Translations 
 Kannadadalli Qur'an Anuvada. The Quran translated to Kannada
 Shikwa and Jawab-e-Shikwa: The Complaint and the Answer: The Human Grievance and the Divine Response. A set of two epic Urdu poems by Muhammad Iqbal originally published in 1913 translated to English 
 The Devil’s Advisory Council: Iblees Ki Majlis-e-Shura.  It is one of the final works of Muhammad Iqbal,originally published in 1935. Translated from Urdu to English

References

External links
 Abdussalam Puthige interviewed by Yoginder Sikand
 Mangalorean dot com
 Times of India
 Website of Varthabharathi Kannada daily

1964 births
Writers from Karnataka
Living people
Mangaloreans
People from Dakshina Kannada district
Journalists from Karnataka